Bencollaghduff at , is the 93rd–highest peak in Ireland on the Arderin scale, and the 115th–highest peak on the Vandeleur-Lynam scale.  Bencollaghduff is situated near the centre of the core massif of the Twelve Bens mountain range in the Connemara National Park in Galway, Ireland. It is the 3rd tallest mountain of the Twelve Bens range, after Benbaun , to which it is connected by the northern col of Maumina; and after Bencorr , to which it is connected by a high southeast rocky ridge.

Bencollaghduff's prominence of  qualifies it as a Marilyn, and it also ranks it as the 56th-highest mountain in Ireland on the MountainViews Online Database, 100 Highest Irish Mountains, where the minimum prominence threshold is 100 metres.

Naming
According to Irish academic Paul Tempan, "Bencollaghduff" most likely means "peak of the black hags", however, the hags in question are cormorant birds and not witch-like characters. Tempan notes that the Ordnance Survey Ireland form of "Binn Dhubh" is a prescribed standard modern Irish form.  Cartographer Tim Robinson's maps of Connemara uses "Binn Dubh", which represents the local dialect.

Hill walking

Bencollaghduff is often climbed as part of the popular 16–kilometre 8–9 hour Glencoaghan Horseshoe, considered one of Ireland's best hill-walks.  Bencollaghduff is also climbed as part of the even longer Owenglin Horseshoe, a 20–kilometre 10–12 hour route around the Owenglin River taking in over twelve summits;

In literature 
The Irish novelist Joseph O'Connor in his award-winning novel Star of the Sea, cites the quarzite shale on the slopes of Bencollaghduff.

Gallery

Bibliography

See also

Twelve Bens
Mweelrea, major range in Killary Harbour
Maumturks, major range in Connemara
Lists of mountains in Ireland
Lists of mountains and hills in the British Isles
List of Marilyns in the British Isles
List of Hewitt mountains in England, Wales and Ireland

References

External links
MountainViews: The Irish Mountain Website, Bencollaghduff 
MountainViews: Irish Online Mountain Database
The Database of British and Irish Hills , the largest database of British Isles mountains ("DoBIH")
Hill Bagging UK & Ireland, the searchable interface for the DoBIH

Marilyns of Ireland
Hewitts of Ireland
Mountains and hills of County Galway
Geography of County Galway
Mountains under 1000 metres